The Colosseum was an express train initially linking Rome and Milan, later Frankfurt am Main. The train was named after the Amphitheatrum Flavium, renowned as the Colosseum.

Trans Europ Express
The Colosseum was the successor to the TEE Settebello on the same route and schedule. The ETR 300 rolling stock was replaced by locomotive-hauled coaches of the Gran Conforto class. Because the name Settebello was widely associated with the ETR 300 stock, the name of the Milan – Rome service was changed as well. On 3 June 1984 the service continued as TEE Colosseum (or Colosseo in Italian). The train was hauled by FS Class E.444 locomotives and used the Gran Conforto coaches that had been used in the TEE Adriatico until 2 June 1984. After three years of service as a TEE the Colosseum was converted to a two-class InterCity.

EuroCity
On 28 May 1989 the route was extended farther north to Frankfurt am Main and, being international, the train qualified as EuroCity. The coaches for the EuroCity service were provided by Deutsche Bundesbahn. In 1991 the German InterCityExpress (ICE) started with the opening of the Hanover – Würzburg high-speed railway. This meant a reorganisation of the long-distance train services that affected the EuroCitys as well. Travellers to Frankfurt could use the ICE north of Basel, but the Rhine valley farther north did not yet have a high-speed service, and the number of EuroCitys there was increased. Travellers from Milan to Germany could use the EC Verdi but this train did not operate south of Milan. The Colosseum was shortened to the Rome – Basel portion, which continued in operation until 31 May 1997. On 1 June 1997 Cisalpino introduced ETR 470 tilting trains between Milan and Basel, which replaced the EC Colosseum.

References

Works cited

International named passenger trains
Named passenger trains of Germany
Named passenger trains of Switzerland
Named passenger trains of Italy
Trans Europ Express
EuroCity
Railway services introduced in 1984
Railway services discontinued in 1997